Caged Fury may refer to:

Caged Fury (1948 film), a drama film
Caged Fury (1983 film), film by Cirio H. Santiago with Taaffe O'Connell
Caged Fury (1989 film), a women in prison film

See also
Caged Heat II: Stripped of Freedom, the sequel to the 1989 film